Zachaenus is a genus of frogs in the family Cycloramphidae. There are two species that both are endemic to southeastern Brazil. Common name bug-eyed frogs has been coined for the genus.

Ecology
Zachaenus are leaf-litter inhabitants of the Atlantic rainforest of southeastern Brazil.

Species
The genus contains the following species:
 Zachaenus carvalhoi Izecksohn, 1983
 Zachaenus parvulus (Girard, 1853)

References

 
Cycloramphidae
Amphibian genera
Amphibians of South America
Endemic fauna of Brazil
Taxa named by Edward Drinker Cope
Taxonomy articles created by Polbot